Prudential Regulatory Authority or Prudential Regulation Authority may refer to:
Australian Prudential Regulation Authority
Prudential Regulation Authority (United Kingdom)